John McEnroe was the defending champion but lost in the final 2–6, 7–6, 6–1, 6–2 to Jimmy Connors.

Seeds
A champion seed is indicated in bold text while text in italics indicates the round in which that seed was eliminated.

  John McEnroe (final)
  Jimmy Connors (champion)

Draw

References
1980 World Championship Tennis Finals Draw

Singles